Yagit (International title: The Street Urchins / ) is a Philippine television drama series broadcast by GMA Network. It stars Jaypee de Guzman, Janet Elisa Giron, Jocelyn Dela-Cruz and Tom-tom. It premiered on April 25, 1983. The series concluded on August 2, 1985 with a total of 586 episodes. It was replaced by Amorsola on its timeslot.

The series was adapted into a film Mga Batang Yagit in 1984  and a television series in 2014.

Cast and characters
Lead cast
Jaypee de Guzman as Ding
Janet Elisa Giron as Elisa
Jocelyn Dela-Cruz as Jocelyn
Tom-tom as Tom-tom
Ernie Garcia as Victor

Supporting cast
Connie Angeles as Sese
Jervy Cruz as Jerby
Romy Diaz as Chito
Joaquin Fajardo as Damaso
Ric Santos as Kanor
Amy Austria as Dolor
Ana Capri as Crizelda
Marianne Dela Riva as Lena
Zeny Zabala as Claudia
Rowell Santiago as Marino
Jay Ilagan as Roman
Mayros Sabelino as Tipanya
Bembol Roco as Gerardino

References

External links
 

1983 Philippine television series debuts
1985 Philippine television series endings
Filipino-language television shows
GMA Network drama series
Television shows set in the Philippines